Playhouse is a 2020 British horror-thriller film written and directed by Fionn and Toby Watts. The film stars Rebecca Calienda, Grace Courtney, Mathilde Darmady, Julie Higginson, William Holstead, Helen Mackay, Eilidh McLaughlin, and James Rottger.

It premiered at the 2020 London FrightFest Film Festival and was released online on 17 November 2020.

Premise 
In a remote Scottish castle, an irreverent writer faces terrifying consequences when his daughter falls prey to an evil curse lurking within the walls.

Cast 

 Rebecca Calienda as Kathryn
 Grace Courtney as Bee Travis
 Mathilde Darmady as Katie
 Julie Higginson as Samantha
 William Holstead as Jack Travis
 Helen Mackay as Jenny Andrews
 Eilidh McLaughlin as Alex
 James Rottger as Callum Andrews

Release 
The film premiered on 28 August 2020 at FrightFest and was released to video on-demand platforms on 17 November 2020.

Reception 
Paul Grammatico of Dread Central scored the film 3.5/5 and said "If you are looking for a good throwback to a grand old gothic good time, Playhouse will be a dreadful delight." Film Threat's Andrew Stover gave the film 7/10, and said "Although Playhouse isn't as emotionally critical or tightly written as it should be, The Watts brothers are skilled in nurturing a dour atmosphere and exposing a darker side to the creative impulse."

References

External links 
 

2020 films
2020 horror thriller films
British horror thriller films
Films set in Scotland
Films set in castles
2020s English-language films
2020s British films